Rubén Luis di Palma (October 27, 1944 in Arrecifes – September 30, 2000 in Carlos Tejedor) was an Argentine racing driver. He won the Sport Prototipo Argentino championship in 1971, 1972 and 1972, the Turismo Carretera championship 1970 (Formula A) and 1971, the Fórmula 1 Mecánica Argentina championship in 1974 and 1978 and the TC2000 championship in 1983. He died in September 2000, when the Robinson R44 helicopter he was flying spun out of control and crashed near Carlos Tejedor, Buenos Aires Province.

24 Hours of Le Mans results

References

1944 births
2000 deaths
Argentine racing drivers
TC 2000 Championship drivers
Turismo Carretera drivers
24 Hours of Le Mans drivers
Argentine sportsperson-politicians
People from Arrecifes
Victims of aviation accidents or incidents in Argentina
World Sportscar Championship drivers
Sportspeople from Buenos Aires Province

Audi Sport drivers